KACR-LP is a low power FM radio station broadcasting a community radio format out of Alameda, California on 96.1 FM. Licensed to Alameda Community Radio, it began broadcasting on February 23, 2015.

See also
List of community radio stations in the United States

References

External links 
Official website

Radio stations established in 2017
ACR-LP
Community radio stations in the United States
ACR-LP
2017 establishments in California